Charles Beard Izard (4 December 1829 – 23 October 1904) was a 19th-century Member of Parliament and lawyer in Wellington, New Zealand.

Biography

Early life
Izard was born in Brighton, England, and educated at King's College London and Magdalene College, Cambridge, graduating in mathematics in 1854. After studying at Lincoln's Inn he was admitted to the bar in England. He married Miss Mary Ann Hayward from Sussex in 1859. She died in Wellington on 18 July 1900 aged 71 years.

In 1860 they emigrated to Auckland, and that year moved to Wellington. He was a Crown solicitor and partner in the law firm that became Bell Gully. His son, Charles Hayward Izard, was a partner in that firm from 1882 to 1897. He was on the boards of local schools and local companies e.g. the Wellington and Manawatu Railway Company and the Meat Export Company. He retired from the law in 1887 due to failing eyesight.

Political career

His son Charles Hayward Izard was also a Member of Parliament.

References

1829 births
1904 deaths
Alumni of King's College London
Alumni of Magdalene College, Cambridge
Burials at Bolton Street Cemetery
Members of the New Zealand House of Representatives
New Zealand MPs for Wellington electorates
People from Brighton
English emigrants to New Zealand
19th-century New Zealand politicians
19th-century New Zealand lawyers
Unsuccessful candidates in the 1890 New Zealand general election
Unsuccessful candidates in the 1881 New Zealand general election
Unsuccessful candidates in the 1884 New Zealand general election